Anthony Shepherd (born 16 November 1966) is a Scottish former footballer. He was a midfielder coming from the Celtic Boys Club.

Shepherd signed with the senior Celtic side in August 1983 and debuted at Parkhead in a 2-1 Scottish Cup victory over Queen's Park on 15 February 1986, providing assists for both the goals in that game for Brian McClair and Roy Aitken. He was sent off in the 1986 Scottish League Cup Final when the referee assumed he had been struck by Shepherd from behind. When the referee accepted that he had been hit by a coin and not by Shepherd, he allowed Shepherd to remain on the field.

Shepherd struggled to hold down a first team place at Celtic and was sent on loan to Bristol City during the 1988/89 season. He left Celtic in 1989 and had spells with clubs including Carlisle United, Motherwell, Portadown and Cliftonville.

Honours

County Antrim Shield
 Cliftonville 1997

References

External links 

Tony Shepherd at TheCelticWiki, an external wiki

1966 births
Living people
Footballers from Glasgow
Scottish footballers
Association football midfielders
Celtic F.C. players
Bristol City F.C. players
Motherwell F.C. players
Portadown F.C. players
Cliftonville F.C. players
Scottish Football League players
English Football League players
NIFL Premiership players
Carlisle United F.C. players
Partick Thistle F.C. players
Ayr United F.C. players
Stranraer F.C. players
Glenavon F.C. players
Albion Rovers F.C. players
Scotland youth international footballers